Selzerbeek (or Senserbach, Sinselbeek, Sinselbaach, Selzerbaek) is a river of North Rhine-Westphalia, Germany and Limburg in the Netherlands.

Geography 
The Selzerbeek originates in Germany below the tripoint Germany-Belgium-Netherlands at Vaalserberg and flows through Vaalserquartier.

From Vaals through Lemiers to Mamelis the Selzerbeek forms the natural border between the Netherlands and Germany.
In this area, it flows to other small streams: the Orsbacher Puetz, the Zieversbach at Holset, the Herman Bach Lemiers and Harleserbach at Harles.

Behind Mamelis flows Selzerbeek by the Netherlands, parallel to Provincial route 278 along the villages Nijswiller, Wahlwiller and Partij until it empties into the Geul (a direct tributary of the Meuse) near Wittem.

History 
The area Vaals-Lemiers-Vijlen belongs to the Netherlands since 1661. Since forming the Selzerbeek the old frontier.

Environment and water quality 
After investigations by the MUNLV NRW in Selzerbeek's exposure to pesticides, metals and other pollutants low or below the detection limit (2008)

Sites and monuments 

At the Selzerbeek are several water mills: The Lemierser mill in the Mamelis Schoeërmolen, as well as in Wittem the mill of the monastery and the Wittemermolen.

References

Rivers of North Rhine-Westphalia
Rivers of the Netherlands
Rivers of South Limburg (Netherlands)
Gulpen-Wittem
Vaals
Rivers of Germany
Germany–Netherlands border
International rivers of Europe
Border rivers